Midnight sun is a natural phenomenon that occurs in the summer months in places north of the Arctic Circle or south of the Antarctic Circle, when the Sun remains visible at the local midnight. When midnight sun is seen in the Arctic, the Sun appears to move from left to right, but in Antarctica the equivalent apparent motion is from right to left.  This occurs at latitudes from 65°44' to 90° north or south, and does not stop exactly at the Arctic Circle or the Antarctic Circle, due to refraction.

The opposite phenomenon, polar night, occurs in winter, when the Sun stays below the horizon throughout the day.

Details

Around the summer solstice (approximately 21 June in the Northern Hemisphere and 21 December in the Southern Hemisphere), in certain areas the Sun does not set below the horizon within a 24-hour period.

Geography 

Because there are no permanent human settlements south of the Antarctic Circle, apart from research stations, the countries and territories whose populations experience midnight sun are limited to those crossed by the Arctic Circle: Canada (Yukon, Nunavut, and Northwest Territories), United States (state of Alaska); the nations of Iceland, Finland, Norway, Sweden, Greenland, and Russia.

The largest city of the world north of the Arctic Circle, Murmansk (Russia), experiences midnight sun from 22 May to 22 July (62 days).

A quarter of Finland's territory lies north of the Arctic Circle, and at the country's northernmost point the Sun does not set at all for 72 days during summer.

In Svalbard, Norway, the northernmost inhabited region of Europe, there is no sunset from approximately 19 April to 23 August. The extreme sites are the poles, where the Sun can be continuously visible for half the year. The North Pole has midnight sun for 6 months from late March to late September.

Polar circle proximity 
Because of atmospheric refraction, and also because the Sun is a disc rather than a point in the sky, midnight sun may be experienced at latitudes slightly south of the Arctic Circle or north of the Antarctic Circle, though not exceeding one degree (depending on local conditions). For example, Iceland is known for its midnight sun, even though most of it (Grímsey is the exception) is slightly south of the Arctic Circle. For the same reasons, the period of sunlight at the poles is slightly longer than six months. Even the northern extremities of the United Kingdom (and places at similar latitudes, such as Saint Petersburg) experience twilight throughout the night in the northern sky at around the summer solstice.

Places sufficiently close to the poles, such as Alert, Nunavut, experience times where it does not get entirely dark at night yet the Sun does not rise either, combining effects of midnight sun and polar night, for example where during the "day" it reaches civil twilight and at "night" only reaches astronomical twilight.

White nights 

Locations where the Sun remains less than 6 (or 7) degrees below the horizonbetween 60° 34’ (or 59° 34’) latitude and the polar circleexperience midnight civil twilight instead of midnight sun, so that daytime activities, such as reading, are still possible without artificial light on a clear night. This happens in both Northern Hemisphere summer solstice and Southern Hemisphere summer solstice. The lowest latitude to experience midnight sun without golden hour is 72°33′43″ North or South.

White Nights have become a common symbol of Saint Petersburg, Russia, where they occur from about 11 June to 1 July, and the last 10 days of June are celebrated with cultural events known as the White Nights Festival.

The northernmost tip of Antarctica also experiences white nights near the Southern Hemisphere summer solstice.

Explanation 

Since the axial tilt of Earth is considerable (23 degrees, 26 minutes, 21.41196 seconds), at high latitudes the Sun does not set in summer; rather, it remains continuously visible for one day during the summer solstice at the polar circle, for several weeks only  closer to the pole, and for six months at the pole. At extreme latitudes, midnight sun is usually referred to as polar day.

At the poles themselves, the Sun rises and sets only once each year on the equinox. During the six months that the Sun is above the horizon, it spends the days appearing to continuously move in circles around the observer, gradually spiralling higher and reaching its highest circuit of the sky at the summer solstice.

Time zones and daylight saving time

The term "midnight sun" refers to the consecutive 24-hour periods of sunlight experienced in the north of the Arctic Circle and south of the Antarctic Circle. Other phenomena are sometimes referred to as "midnight sun", but they are caused by time zones and the observance of daylight saving time. For instance, in Fairbanks, Alaska, which is south of the Arctic Circle, the Sun sets at 12:47a.m. at the summer solstice. This is because Fairbanks is 51 minutes ahead of its idealized time zone (as most of the state is in one time zone) and Alaska observes daylight saving time. (Fairbanks is at about 147.72 degrees west, corresponding to UTC−9 hours 51 minutes, and is on UTC−9 in winter.) This means that solar culmination occurs at about 12:51p.m. instead of at 12 noon.

If a precise moment for the genuine "midnight sun" is required, the observer's longitude, the local civil time and the equation of time must be taken into account. The moment of the Sun's closest approach to the horizon coincides with its passing due north at the observer's position, which occurs only approximately at midnight in general. Each degree of longitude east of the Greenwich meridian makes the vital moment exactly 4 minutes earlier than midnight as shown on the clock, while each hour that the local civil time is ahead of coordinated universal time (UTC, also known as GMT) makes the moment an hour later. These two effects must be added. Furthermore, the equation of time (which depends on the date) must be added: a positive value on a given date means that the Sun is running slightly ahead of its average position, so the value must be subtracted.

As an example, at the North Cape of Norway at midnight on June 21/22, the longitude of 25.9 degrees east makes the moment 103.2 minutes earlier by clock time; but the local time, 2 hours ahead of GMT in the summer, makes it 120 minutes later by clock time. The equation of time at that date is -2.0 minutes. Therefore, the Sun's lowest elevation occurs 120 - 103.2 + 2.0 minutes after midnight: at 00.19 Central European Summer time. On other nearby dates the only thing different is the equation of time, so this remains a reasonable estimate for a considerable period. The Sun's altitude remains within half a degree of the minimum of about 5 degrees for about 45 minutes either side of this time.

When it rotates on its own axis, it sometimes moves closer to the Sun.  During this period of Earth's rotation from May to July, Earth tilts at an angle of 23.5 degrees above its own axis in its orbit. This causes the part of Norway located in the Arctic region at the North Pole of Earth to move very close to the Sun and during this time the length of the day increases. It can be said that it almost never subsides. Night falls in Norway's Hammerfest at this particular time of year.

Duration
The number of days per year with potential midnight sun increases the closer one goes towards either pole. Although approximately defined by the polar circles, in practice midnight sun can be seen as much as 90 km (55 miles) outside the polar circle, as described below, and the exact latitudes of the farthest reaches of midnight sun depend on topography and vary slightly year-to-year.

Even though at the Arctic Circle the center of the Sun is, per definition and without refraction by the atmosphere, only visible during one summer night, some part of midnight sun is visible at the Arctic Circle from approximately 12 June until 1 July. This period extends as one travels north: At Cape Nordkinn, Norway, the northernmost point of Continental Europe, midnight sun lasts approximately from 14 May to 29 July. On the Svalbard archipelago farther north, it lasts from 20 April to 22 August.

Southern and Northern poles 
Also, the periods of polar day and polar night are unequal in both polar regions because the Earth is at perihelion in early January and at aphelion in early July.  As a result, the polar day is longer than the polar night in the Northern Hemisphere (at Utqiagvik, Alaska, for example, polar day lasts 84 days, while polar night lasts only 68 days), while in the Southern Hemisphere, the situation is the reverse — the polar night is longer than the polar day.

Observers at heights appreciably above sea level can experience extended periods of midnight sun as a result of the "dip" of the horizon viewed from altitude.

References

Further reading
 Lutgens F.K., Tarbuck E.J. (2007) The Atmosphere, Tenth Edition, page 39, PEARSON, Prentice Hall, NJ.

External links

 Midnight sun seen from Fjellheisen Tromsø - 360 panorama

 What is the secret behind midnight sun in Norway

Earth phenomena
Geography of the Arctic
Sun